Crimean Tatars or Crimeans are a Turkic ethnic group and nation who are an indigenous people of Crimea. The formation and ethnogenesis of Crimean Tatars occurred during the 13th–17th centuries, uniting Cumans, who appeared in Crimea in the 10th century, with other peoples who had inhabited Crimea since ancient times and gradually underwent Tatarization, including Greeks, Italians, Armenians, Goths, Sarmatians, and others.

Crimean Tatars constituted the majority of Crimea's population from the time of ethnogenesis until the mid-19th century, and the largest ethnic population until the end of the 19th century. Russia attempted to purge through a combination of physical violence, intimidation, forced resettlement, and legalized forms of discrimination between 1783 and 1900. Between Russia’s annexation of Crimea in 1783 and 1800, somewhere between 100,000 and 300,000 Crimean Tatars emigrated. However, this did not result in the complete eradication of Crimean Tatar cultural elements (at least not under the Romanov dynasty; however, under the Soviets, the Crimean Tatars were almost completely driven from the Crimean peninsula).Almost immediately after retaking of Crimea from Axis forces, in May 1944, the USSR State Defense Committee ordered the deportation of all of the Crimean Tatars from Crimea, including the families of Crimean Tatars who had served in the Soviet Army. The deportees were transported in trains and boxcars to Central Asia, primarily to Uzbekistan. The Crimean Tatars lost 18 to 46 percent of their population as a result of the deportations. Starting in 1967, a few were allowed to return and in 1989 the Supreme Soviet of the Soviet Union condemned the removal of Crimean Tatars from their motherland as inhumane and lawless, but only a tiny percent were able to return before the full right of return became policy in 1989.

The European Union and international indigenous groups do not dispute their status as an indigenous people and they have been officially recognized as an indigenous people of Ukraine as of 2014. The current Russian administration considers them a "national minority", but not an indigenous people, and continues to deny that they are titular people of Crimea, even though the Soviet Union considered them indigenous before their deportation and the subsequent dissolution of the Crimean Autonomous Soviet Socialist Republic (Crimean ASSR). Today, Crimean Tatars constitute approximately 15% of the population of Crimea.  There remains a Crimean Tatar diaspora in Turkey and Uzbekistan.

The Crimean Tatars have been members of the Unrepresented Nations and Peoples Organization (UNPO) since 1991.

Distribution

In the Ukrainian census of 2001, 248,200 Ukrainian citizens identified themselves as Crimean Tatars with 98% (or about 243,400) of them living in the Autonomous Republic of Crimea. An additional 1,800 (or about 0.7%) lived in the city of Sevastopol, also on the Crimean peninsula, but outside the border of the autonomous republic.

About 150,000 remain in exile in Central Asia, mainly in Uzbekistan. The official number of Crimean Tatars in Turkey is 150,000 with some Crimean Tatar activists estimating a figure as high as 6 million. The activists reached this number by taking one million Tatar immigrants to Turkey as a starting point and multiplying this number by the birth rate in the span of the last hundred years. Crimean Tatars in Turkey mostly live in Eskişehir Province, descendants of those who emigrated in the late 18th, 19th and early 20th centuries. The Dobruja region of Romania and Bulgaria is home to more than 27,000 Crimean Tatars, with the majority in Romania and approximately 3,000 on the Bulgarian side of the border.

Sub-ethnic groups

The Crimean Tatars are subdivided into three sub-ethnic groups:

the Tats (not to be confused with the Iranic Tat people, living in the Caucasus region) who used to inhabit the mountainous Crimea before 1944 predominantly are Cumans, Greeks, Goths and other people, as Tats in Crimea also were called Hellenic Urum people (Greeks settled in Crimea) who were deported by the Imperial Russia to the area around Mariupol; The term Tat appears already in the 8th century Orkhon inscriptions denoting "a subjected foreign people". In the 17th century Crimean context, it probably denoted various peoples of foreign (ie. non-Turkic) origin living under the khan's rule, especially the Greeks, Italians, and the remnants of Goths and Alans inhabiting the mountainous southern section of Crimea.
the Yaliboylu who lived on the Southern Coast of the peninsula before 1944 and practiced Christianity until the 14th century;
the Noğays (not to be confused with related Nogai people, living now in Southern Russia) — former inhabitants of the Crimean steppe.

Historians suggest that inhabitants of the mountainous parts of Crimea lying to the central and southern parts (the Tats), and those of the Southern coast of Crimea (the Yalıboyu) were the direct descendants of the Pontic Greeks, Armenians, Scythians, Ostrogoths (Crimean Goths) and Kipchaks along with the Cumans while the latest inhabitants of the northern steppe represent the descendants of the Nogai Horde of the Black Sea, nominally subjects of the Crimean Khan. It is largely assumed that the Tatarization process that mostly took place in the 16th century brought a sense of cultural unity through the blending of the Greeks, Armenians, Italians and Ottoman Turks of the southern coast, Goths of the central mountains and Turkic-speaking Kipchaks and Cumans of the steppe and forming of the Crimean Tatar ethnic group. However, the Cuman language is considered the direct ancestor of the current language of the Crimean Tatars with possible incorporations of the other languages, like Crimean Gothic. The fact that Crimean Tatars' ethnogenesis took place in Crimea and consisted of several stages lasting over 2500 years is proved by genetic research showing that the gene pool of the Crimean Tatars preserved both the initial components for more than 2.5 thousand years, and later in the northern steppe regions of the Crimea.

Some famous Crimean Tatar historians such as Halil Inalcik and Ilber Ortayli refused to use the term Tatar, they preferred to use the term "Crimean" or "Cuman" to describe Cuman-Kipchak speaking Crimean people who were settled in Pontic Steppes before the Tatar migration.

The Mongol conquest of the Kipchaks led to a merged society with a Mongol ruling class over a Kipchak speaking population which came to be dubbed Tatar and which eventually absorbed other ethnicities on the Crimean peninsula like Armenians, Italians, Greeks, and Goths to form the modern day Crimean Tatar people; up to the Soviet deportation, the Crimean Tatars could still differentiate among themselves between Tatar, Kipchak, Nogays, and the "Tat" descendants of Tatarized Goths and other Turkified peoples.

History

Origin

The Crimean Tatars were formed as a people in Crimea and are descendants of various peoples who lived in Crimea in different historical eras. The main ethnic groups that inhabited the Crimea at various times and took part in the formation of the Crimean Tatar people are Tauri, Scythians, Sarmatians, Alans, Greeks, Goths, Huns, Bulgars, Khazars, Pechenegs, Cumans, Italians and Circassians. The consolidation of this diverse ethnic conglomerate into a single Crimean Tatar people took place over the course of centuries. The connecting elements in this process were the commonality of the territory, the Turkic language and Islamic religion.

By the end of the 15th century, the main prerequisites that led to the formation of an independent Crimean Tatar ethnic group were created: the political dominance of the Crimean Khanate was established in Crimea, the Turkic languages (Cuman-Kipchak on the territory of the khanate) became dominant, and Islam acquired the status of a state religion throughout the Peninsula. By a preponderance Cumanian population of the Crimea acquired the name "Tatars", the Islamic religion and Turkic language, and the process of consolidating the multi-ethnic conglomerate of the Peninsula began, which has led to the emergence of the Crimean Tatar people. Over several centuries, on the basis of Cuman language with a noticeable Oghuz influence, the Crimean Tatar language has developed.

Golden Horde and Crimean Khanate

At the beginning of the 13th century, the Crimea, the majority of the population of which was already composed of a Turkic people — Cumans, became a part of the Golden Horde. The Crimean Tatars mostly adopted Islam in the 14th century and thereafter Crimea became one of the centers of Islamic civilization in Eastern Europe. In the same century, trends towards separatism appeared in the Crimean Ulus of the Golden Horde. De facto independence of the Crimea from the Golden Horde may be counted since the beginning of princess (khanum) Canike's, the daughter of the powerful Khan of the Golden Horde Tokhtamysh and the wife of the founder of the Nogai Horde Edigey, reign in the peninsula. During her reign she strongly supported Hacı Giray in the struggle for the Crimean throne until her death in 1437. Following the death of Canike, the situation of Hacı Giray in Crimea weakened and he was forced to leave Crimea for Lithuania.

The Crimean Tatars emerged as a nation at the time of the Crimean Khanate, an Ottoman vassal state during the 16th to 18th centuries. Russian historian, doctor of history, Professor of the Russian Academy of Sciences Ilya Zaytsev writes that analysis of historical data shows that the influence of Turkey on the policy of the Crimea was not as high as it was reported in old Turkish sources and Imperial Russian ones. The Turkic-speaking population of Crimea had mostly adopted Islam already in the 14th century, following the conversion of Ozbeg Khan of the Golden Horde. By the time of the first Russian invasion of Crimea in 1736, the Khan's archives and libraries were famous throughout the Islamic world, and under Khan Krym-Girei the city of Aqmescit was endowed with piped water, sewerage and a theatre where Molière was performed in French, while the port of Kezlev stood comparison with Rotterdam and Bakhchysarai, the capital, was described as Europe's cleanest and greenest city.

In 1441, an embassy from the representatives of several strongest clans of the Crimea, including the Golden Horde clans Shırın and Barın and the Cumanic clan — Kıpçak, went to the Grand Duchy of Lithuania to invite Hacı Giray to rule in the Crimea. He became the founder of the Giray dynasty, which ruled until the annexation of the Crimean Khanate by Russia in 1783. Hacı I Giray was a Jochid descendant of Genghis Khan and of his grandson Batu Khan of the Golden Horde. During the reign of Meñli I Giray, Hacı's son, the army of the Great Horde that still existed then invaded the Crimea from the north, Crimean Khan won the general battle, overtaking the army of the Horde Khan in Takht-Lia, where he was killed, the Horde ceased to exist, and the Crimean Khan became the Great Khan and the successor of this state. Since then, the Crimean Khanate was among the strongest powers in Eastern Europe until the beginning of the 18th century. The Khanate officially operated as a vassal state of the Ottoman Empire, with great autonomy after 1580. At the same time, the Nogai hordes, not having their own khan, were vassals of the Crimean one, Muskovy and Polish-Lithuanian commonwealth paid annual tribute to the khan (until 1700 and 1699 respectively). In the 17th century, the Crimean Tatars helped Ukrainian Cossacks led by Bohdan Khmelnytsky in the struggle for independence, which allowed them to win several decisive victories over Polish troops.

In 1711, when Peter I of Russia went on a campaign with all his troops (80,000) to gain access to the Black Sea, he was surrounded by the army of the Crimean Khan Devlet II Giray, finding himself in a hopeless situation. And only the betrayal of the Ottoman vizier Baltacı Mehmet Pasha allowed Peter to get out of the encirclement of the Crimean Tatars. When Devlet II Giray protested against the vizier's decision, his response was: "You should know your Tatar affairs. The affairs of the Sublime Porte are entrusted to me. You do not have the right to interfere in them". Treaty of the Pruth was signed, and 10 years later, Russia declared itself an empire. In 1736, the Crimean Khan Qaplan I Giray was summoned by the Turkish Sultan Ahmed III to Persia. Understanding that Russia could take advantage of the lack of troops in Crimea, Qaplan Giray wrote to the Sultan to think twice, but the Sultan was persistent. As it was expected by Qaplan Giray, in 1736 the Russian army invaded the Crimea, led by Münnich, devastated the peninsula, killed civilians and destroyed all major cities, occupied the capital, Bakhchisaray, and burnt the Khan's palace with all the archives and documents, and then left the Crimea because of the epidemic that had begun in it. One year after the same was done by another Russian general — Peter Lacy. Since then, the Crimean Khanate had not been able to recover, and its slow decline began. The Russo-Turkish War of 1768 to 1774 resulted in the defeat of the Ottomans by the Russians, and according to the Treaty of Küçük Kaynarca (1774) signed after the war, Crimea became independent and the Ottomans renounced their political right to protect the Crimean Khanate. After a period of political unrest in Crimea, Imperial Russia violated the treaty and annexed the Crimean Khanate in 1783.

The main population of the Crimean khanate were Crimean Tatars, along with them in the Crimean khanate lived significant communities of Karaites, Italians, Armenians, Greeks, Circassians and Roma. In the early 16th century under the rule of the Crimean khans passed part of Nogays (Mangyts), who roamed outside the Crimean Peninsula, moving there during periods of drought and starvation. The majority of the population professed Islam of the Hanafi stream; part of the population – Orthodox, Monotheletism, Judaism; in the 16th century. There were small Catholic communities. The Crimean Tatar population of the Crimean Peninsula was partially exempt from taxes. The Greeks paid dzhyziya, the Italians were in a privileged position due to the partial tax relief made during the reign of Meñli Geray I. By the 18 century the population of the Crimean khanate was about 500 thousand people. The territory of the Crimean khanate was divided into Kinakanta (governorships), which consisted of Kadylyk, covering a number of settlements.

Until the beginning of the 18th century, Crimean Nogays were known for frequent, at some periods almost annual, slave raids into Ukraine and Russia. For a long time, until the late 18th century, the Crimean Khanate maintained a massive slave trade with the Ottoman Empire and the Middle East which was one of the important factors of its economy. One of the most important trading ports and slave markets was Kefe. According to the Ottoman census of 1526, taxes on the sale and purchase of slaves accounted for 24% of the funds, levied in Ottoman Crimea for all activities. But in fact, there were always small raids committed by both Tatars and Cossacks, in both directions. The 17th century Ottoman writer and traveller Evliya Çelebi wrote that there were 920,000 Ukrainian slaves in the Crimea but only 187,000 free Muslims. However, the Ukrainian historian Sergey Gromenko considers this testimony of Çelebi a myth popular among ultranationalists, pointing out that today it is known from the writings on economics that in the 17th century, the Crimea could feed no more than 500 thousand people. For comparison, according to the notes of the Consul of France to Qırım Giray khan Baron Totta, a hundred years later, in 1767, there were 4 million people living in the Crimean khanate,  and in 1778, that is, just eleven years later, all the Christians were evicted from its territory by the Russian authorities, which turned out to be about 30 thousand, mostly Armenians and Greeks, and there were no Ukrainians among them. Also, according to more reliable modern sources than Evliya's data, slaves never constituted a significant part of the Crimean population. Russian professor Glagolev writes that there were 1.800.000 free Crimean Tatars in the Crimean Khanate in 1666, it also should be mentioned that a huge part of Ukraine was part of the Crimean Khanate, that is why Ukrainians could have been taken into account in the general population of the Khanate by Evliya (see Khan Ukraine).

Some researchers estimate that more than 2 million people were captured and enslaved during the time of the Crimean Khanate. Polish historian Bohdan Baranowski assumed that in the 17th century Polish–Lithuanian Commonwealth (present-day Poland, Ukraine and Belarus) lost an average of 20,000 yearly and as many as one million in all years combined from 1500 to 1644. In retaliation, the lands of Crimean Tatars were being raided by Zaporozhian Cossacks, armed Ukrainian horsemen, who defended the steppe frontier – Wild Fields – against Tatar slave raids and often attacked and plundered the lands of Ottoman Turks and Crimean Tatars. The Don Cossacks and Kalmyk Mongols also managed to raid Crimean Tatars' land. The last recorded major Crimean raid, before those in the Russo-Turkish War (1768–74) took place during the reign of Peter the Great (1682–1725). However, Cossack raids continued after that time; Ottoman Grand Vizier complained to the Russian consul about raids to Crimea and Özi in 1761. In 1769 one last major Tatar raid, which took place during the Russo-Turkish War, saw the capture of 20,000 slaves.

Nevertheless, some historians, including Russian historian Valery Vozgrin and Polish historian Oleksa Gayvoronsky have emphasized that the role of the slave trade in the economy of the Crimean Khanate is greatly exaggerated by modern historians, and the raiding-dependent economy is nothing but a historical myth. According to modern researches, livestock occupied a leading position in the economy of the Crimean Khanate, Crimean Khanate was one of the main wheat suppliers to the Ottoman Empire. Salt mining, viticulture and winemaking, horticulture and gardening were also developed as sources of income.

When reading the history of the Crimean Tatars, it is necessary to take into account that the historical science about the Crimean Tatars is strongly influenced by Russian historians who have rewritten the history of the Crimean Khanate to justify the annexation of the Crimea in 1783, and, especially, then by Soviet historians who distorted the history of the Crimea to justify the 1944 deportation of the Crimean Tatars.

In the Russian Empire

The Russo-Turkish War (1768–74) resulted in the defeat of the Ottomans by the Russians, and according to the Treaty of Küçük Kaynarca (1774) signed after the war, Crimea became independent and the Ottomans renounced their political right to protect the Crimean Khanate. After a period of political unrest in Crimea, Russia violated the treaty and annexed the Crimean Khanate in 1783. After the annexation, the wealthier Tatars, who had exported wheat, meat, fish and wine to other parts of the Black Sea, began to be expelled and to move to the Ottoman Empire. Due to the oppression by the Russian administration and colonial politics of Russian Empire, the Crimean Tatars were forced to immigrate to the Ottoman Empire. Further expulsions followed in 1812 for fear of the reliability of the Tatars in the face of Napoleon's advance. Particularly, the Crimean War of 1853–1856, the laws of 1860–63, the Tsarist policy and the Russo-Turkish War (1877–78) caused an exodus of the Tatars; 12,000 boarded Allied ships in Sevastopol to escape the destruction of shelling, and were branded traitors by the Russian government. Of total Tatar population 300,000 of the Taurida Governorate about 200,000 Crimean Tatars emigrated. Many Crimean Tatars perished in the process of emigration, including those who drowned while crossing the Black Sea. In total, from 1783 till the beginning of the 20th century, at least 800 thousand Tatars left Crimea. Today the descendants of these Crimeans form the Crimean Tatar diaspora in Bulgaria, Romania and Turkey.

Ismail Gasprali (1851–1914) was a renowned Crimean Tatar intellectual, influenced by the nationalist movements of the period, whose efforts laid the foundation for the modernization of Muslim culture and the emergence of the Crimean Tatar national identity. The bilingual Crimean Tatar-Russian newspaper Terciman-Perevodchik he published in 1883–1914, functioned as an educational tool through which a national consciousness and modern thinking emerged among the entire Turkic-speaking population of the Russian Empire. After the Russian Revolution of 1917 this new elite, which included Noman Çelebicihan and Cafer Seydamet Qırımer proclaimed the first democratic republic in the Islamic world, named the Crimean People's Republic on 26 December 1917. However, this republic was short-lived and abolished by the Bolshevik uprising in January 1918.

In the Soviet Union (1917–1991)

As a part of the Russian famine of 1921 the Peninsula suffered widespread starvation. More than 100,000 Crimean Tatars starved to death, and tens of thousands of Tatars fled to Turkey or Romania. Thousands more were deported or killed during the collectivization in 1928–29. The Soviet government's "collectivization" policies led to a major nationwide famine in 1931–33. Between 1917 and 1933, 150,000 Tatars—about 50% of the population at the time—either were killed or forced out of Crimea. During Stalin's Great Purge, statesmen and intellectuals such as Veli İbraimov and Bekir Çoban-zade were imprisoned or executed on various charges.

In May 1944, the entire Crimean Tatar population of Crimea was exiled to Central Asia, mainly to Uzbekistan, on the orders of Joseph Stalin, the General Secretary of the Communist Party of the Soviet Union and the Chairman of the USSR State Defense Committee. Although a great number of Crimean Tatar men served in the Red Army and took part in the partisan movement in Crimea during the war, the existence of a Tatar Legion in the Nazi army and the collaboration of some Crimean Tatar religious and political leaders with Hitler during the German occupation of Crimea provided the Soviet leadership with justification for accusing the entire Crimean Tatar population of being Nazi collaborators. Some modern researchers argue that Crimea's geopolitical position fueled Soviet perceptions of Crimean Tatars as a potential threat. This belief is based in part on an analogy with numerous other cases of deportations of non-Russians from boundary territories, as well as the fact that other non-Russian populations, such as Greeks, Armenians and Bulgarians were also removed from Crimea (see Deportation of the peoples inhabiting Crimea).

All 240,000 Crimean Tatars were deported en masse, in a form of collective punishment, on 17–18 May 1944 as "special settlers" to the Uzbek Soviet Socialist Republic and other distant parts of the Soviet Union. This event is called Sürgün in the Crimean Tatar language; the few who escaped were shot on sight or drowned in scuttled barges, and within months half their number had died of cold, hunger, exhaustion and disease. Many of them were re-located to toil as forced labourers in the Soviet GULAG system.

Civil rights movement

Causes 
Starting in 1944, Crimean Tatars lived mostly in Central Asia with the designation as "special settlers", meaning that they had few rights. "Special settlers" were forbidden from leaving small designated areas and had to frequently sign in at a commandant's office. Soviet propaganda directed towards Uzbeks depicted Crimean Tatars as threats to their homeland, and as a result there were many documented hate crimes against Crimean-Tatar civilians by Uzbek Communist loyalists. In the 1950s the "special settler" regime ended, but Crimean Tatars were still kept closely tethered to Central Asia; while other deported ethnic groups like the Chechens, Karachays, and Kalmyks were fully allowed to return to their native lands during the Khrushchev thaw, economic and political reasons combined with basic misconceptions and stereotypes about Crimean Tatars led to Moscow and Tashkent being reluctant to allow Crimean Tatars the same right of return; the same decree that rehabilitated other deported nations and restored their national republics urged Crimean Tatars who wanted a national republic to seek "national reunification" in the Tatar ASSR in lieu of restoration of the Crimean ASSR, much to the dismay of Crimean Tatars who bore no connection to or desire to "return" to Tatarstan. Moscow's refusal to allow a return was not only based on a desire to satisfy the new Russian settlers in Crimea, who were very hostile to the idea of a return and had been subject to lots of Tatarophobic propaganda, but for economic reasons: high productivity from Crimean Tatar workers in Central Asia meant that letting the diaspora return would take a toll on Soviet industrialization goals in Central Asia. Historians have long suspected that violent resistance to confinement in exile from Chechens led to further willingness to let them return, while the non-violent Crimean Tatar movement did not lead to any desire for Crimean Tatars to leave Central Asia. In effect, the government was punishing Crimean Tatars for being Stakhanovites while rewarding the deported nations that contributed less to the building of socialism, creating further resentment.

A 1967 Soviet decree removed the charges against Crimean Tatars on paper while simultaneously referring to them not by their proper ethnonym but by the euphemism that eventually became standard of "citizens of Tatar nationality who formerly lived in Crimea", angering many Crimean Tatars who realized it meant they were not even seen as Crimean Tatars by the government. In addition, the Soviet government did nothing to facilitate their resettlement in Crimea and to make reparations for lost lives and confiscated property. Before the mass return in the perestroika era, Crimean Tatars made up only 1.5% of Crimea's population, since government entities at all levels took a variety of measures beyond the already-debilitating residence permit system to keep them in Central Asia.

Methods 
The abolition of the special settlement regime made it possible for Crimean Tatar rights activists to mobilize. The primary method of raising grievances with the government was petitioning. Many for the right of return gained over 100,000 signatures; although other methods of protest were occasionally used, the movement remained completely non-violent. When only a small percentage of Crimean Tatars were allowed to return to Crimea, those who were not granted residence permits would return to Crimea and try to live under the radar. However, the lack of a residence permit resulted in a second deportation for them. A last-resort method to avoid a second deportation was self-immolation, famously used by Crimean Tatar national hero Musa Mamut, one of those who moved to Crimea without a residence permit. He doused himself with gasoline and committed self-immolation in front of police trying to deport him on 23 June 1978. Mamut died of severe burns several days later, but expressed no regret for having committed self-immolation. Mamut posthumously became a symbol of Crimean Tatar resistance and nationhood, and remains celebrated by Crimean Tatars. Other notable self-immolations in the name of the Crimean Tatar right of return movement include that of Shavkat Yarullin, who fatally committed self-immolation in front of a government building in protest in October 1989, and Seidamet Balji who attempted self-immolation while being deported from Crimea in December that year but survived. Many other famous Crimean Tatars threatened government authorities with self-immolation if they continued to be ignored, including Hero of the Soviet Union Abdraim Reshidov. In the later years of the Soviet Union, Crimean Tatar activists held picket protests in Red Square.

Results 
After a prolonged effort of lobbying by the Crimean Tatar civil rights movement, the Soviet government established a commission in 1987 to evaluate the request for the right of return, chaired by Andrey Gromyko. Gromyko's condescending attitude and failure to assure them that they would have the right of return ended up concerning members of the Crimean Tatar civil rights movement. In June 1988 he issued an official statement that rejected the request for re-establishment of a Crimean Tatar autonomy in Crimea and supported only allowing an organized return of a few more Crimean Tatars, while agreeing to allow the lower-priority requests of having more publications and school instruction in the Crimean Tatar language at the local level among areas with the deported populations. The conclusion that "no basis to renew autonomy and grant Crimean Tatars the right to return" triggered widespread protests.  Less than two years after Gromyko's commission had rejected their request for autonomy and return, pogroms against the deported Meskhetian Turks were taking place in Central Asia. During the pogroms, some Crimean Tatars were targeted as well, resulting in changing attitudes towards allowing Crimean Tatars to move back to Crimea. Eventually a second commission, chaired by Gennady Yanaev and inclusive of Crimean Tatars on the board, was established in 1989 to reevaluate the issue, and it was decided that the deportation was illegal and the Crimean Tatars were granted the full right to return, revoking previous laws intended to make it as difficult as possible for Crimean Tatars to move to Crimea.

After Ukrainian independence

Today, more than 250,000 Crimean Tatars have returned to their homeland, struggling to re-establish their lives and reclaim their national and cultural rights against many social and economic obstacles. One-third of them are atheists, and over half that consider themselves religious are non-observant. As of 2009, only 15 out of 650 schools in Crimea provide education in the Crimean Tatar language, and only 13 do so in the first three grades.

Squatting in Crimea has been a significant method for Crimean Tatars to rebuild communities in Crimea destroyed by the deportations. These squats have sometimes resulted in violence by Crimean Russians, such as the 1992 , in which the security forces of the separatist Republic of Crimea (not to be confused with the post-2014 government of the same name) attacked a Crimean Tatar squat near the village of Krasny Ray. As a result of the attack on the Krasny Ray settlement, Crimean Tatars stormed the Verkhovna Rada of Crimea, leading to the release of 26 squatters who had been abducted by the Crimean security forces.

Crimean Tatars were recognised as an indigenous people by the 1996 Constitution of Ukraine, and granted a limited number of seats in the 1994 Crimean parliamentary election. Nonetheless, they faced constant discrimination from the authorities of the Autonomous Republic of Crimea, which was primarily governed by ethnic Russians and directed towards Russian interests. Under the presidency of Viktor Yushchenko, increased attention was paid to Crimean Tatars, with trials for crimes against humanity beginning for those involved in the deportations. However, issues of land failed to be resolved.

2014 Annexation of Crimea by the Russian Federation

Following news of Crimea's independence referendum organized with the help of Russia on 16 March 2014, the Kurultai leadership voiced concerns of renewed persecution, as commented by a U.S. official before the visit of a UN human rights team to the peninsula. At the same time, Rustam Minnikhanov, the president of Tatarstan was dispatched to Crimea to quell Crimean Tatars' concerns and to state that "in the 23 years of Ukraine's independence the Ukrainian leaders have been using Crimean Tatars as pawns in their political games without doing them any tangible favors". The issue of Crimean Tatar persecution by Russia has since been raised regularly on an international level.

On 18 March 2014, the day Crimea was annexed by Russia, and Crimean Tatar was de jure declared one of the three official languages of Crimea. It was also announced that Crimean Tatars will be required to relinquish coastal lands on which they squatted since their return to Crimea in the early 1990s and be given land elsewhere in Crimea. Crimea stated it needed the relinquished land for "social purposes", since part of this land is occupied by the Crimean Tatars without legal documents of ownership. The situation was caused by the inability of the USSR (and later Ukraine) to sell the land to Crimean Tatars at a reasonable price instead of giving back to the Tatars the land owned before deportation, once they or their descendants returned from Central Asia (mainly Uzbekistan). As a consequence, some Crimean Tatars settled as squatters, occupying land that was and is still not legally registered.

Some Crimean Tatars fled to Mainland Ukraine due to the Crimean crisis – reportedly around 2000 by 23 March. On 29 March 2014, an emergency meeting of the Crimean Tatars representative body, the Kurultai, voted in favor of seeking "ethnic and territorial autonomy" for Crimean Tatars using "political and legal" means. The meeting was attended by the Head of the Republic of Tatarstan and the chair of the Russian Council of Muftis. Decisions as to whether the Tatars will accept Russian passports or whether the autonomy sought would be within the Russian or Ukrainian state have been deferred pending further discussion.

The Mejlis works in emergency mode in Kyiv.

After the annexation of Crimea by Russian Federation, Crimean Tatars are reportedly persecuted and discriminated by Russian authorities, including cases of torture, arbitrary detentions, forced disappearances by Russian security forces and courts.

On 12 June 2018, Ukraine lodged a memorandum consisting of 17,500 pages of text in 29 volumes to the UN's International Court of Justice about racial discrimination against Crimean Tatars by Russian authorities in occupied Crimea and state financing of terrorism by Russian Federation in Donbas.

Culture 

Yurts or nomadic tents have traditionally played an important role in the cultural history of Crimean Tatars. There are different types of yurts; some are large and collapsible, called "terme", while others are small and non-collapsible (otav).

On the Nowruz holiday, Crimean Tatars usually cook eggs, chicken soup, puff meat pie (kobete), halva, and sweet biscuits. Children put on masks and sing special songs under the windows of their neighbours, receiving sweets in return.

The songs (makam) of the nomadic steppe Crimean Tatars are characterized by diatonic, melodic simplicity and brevity. The songs of mountainous and southern coastal Crimean Tatars, called , are sung with richly ornamented melodies. Household lyricism is also widespread. Occasionally, song competitions take place between young men and women during Crimean holidays and weddings. Ritual folklore includes winter greetings, wedding songs, lamentations and circular dance songs (khoran). Epic stories or destans are very popular among the Crimean Tatars, particularly the destans of "Chora batyr", "Edige", "Koroglu" and others.

Today in use there are two types of alphabet: Cyrillic and Latin. Initially Crimean Tatars used Arabic script. In 1928 it was replaced with the Latin alphabet. Cyrillic was introduced in 1938 based on the Russian alphabet. The Cyrillic alphabet was the only official one between 1938 and 1997. All its letters coincide with those of the Russian alphabet. The 1990s saw the start of the gradual transition of the language to the new Latin alphabet based on the Turkish one.

Cuisine 
The traditional cuisine of the Crimean Tatars has similarities with that of Greeks, Italians, Balkan peoples, Nogays, North Caucasians, and Volga Tatars, although some national dishes and dietary habits vary between different Crimean Tatar regional subgroups; for example, fish and produce are more popular among Yaliboylu Tatar dishes while meat and dairy is more prevalent in Steppe Tatar cuisine. Many Uzbek dishes were incorporated into Crimean Tatar national cuisine during exile in Central Asia since 1944, and these dishes have become prevalent in Crimea since the return. In turn, some Crimean Tatar dishes, including chibureki, have been adopted by peoples outside Crimea, such as in Turkey and the North Caucasus.

Crimean Tatar political parties

National Movement of Crimean Tatars
Founded by Crimean Tatar civil rights activist Yuri Osmanov, the National Movement of Crimean Tatars (NDKT) was the major opposition faction to the Dzhemilev faction during the Soviet era. The official goal of the NDKT during the Soviet era was the restoration of the Crimean ASSR under the Leninist principle of national autonomy for titular indigenous peoples in their homeland, conflicting with the desires of an independent Tatar state from the OKND, the predecessor of the Mejilis. Yuri Osmanov, founder of the organization, was highly critical of Dzhemilev, saying that the OKND, the predecessor of the Mejilis, did not sufficiently try to mend ethnic tensions in Crimea. However, the OKND decreased in popularity after Yuri Osmanov was killed.

Mejlis

In 1991, the Crimean Tatar leadership founded the Kurultai, or Parliament, to act as a representative body for the Crimean Tatars which could address grievances to the Ukrainian central government, the Crimean government, and international bodies. Mejlis of the Crimean Tatar People is the executive body of the Kurultai.

From the 1990s until October 2013, the political leader of the Crimean Tatars and the chairman of the Mejlis of the Crimean Tatar People was former Soviet dissident Mustafa Dzhemilev. Since October 2013 the chairman of the Mejlis of the Crimean Tatar People has been Refat Chubarov.

Following the 2014 Russian annexation of Crimea, Russian authorities declared the Mejlis of the Crimean Tatar People an extremist organization, and banned it on 26 April 2016.

New Milliy Firqa

In 2006, a new Crimean Tatar party in opposition to the Mejlis was founded, taking the name of the previously-defunct Milly Firqa party from the early 20th century. The party claims to be successor of the ideas of Yuri Osmanov and NDKT.

UDTTMR 

In Romanian "Uniunea Democratica a Tatarilor Turco-Musulmani din Romania, UDTTMR" in Crimean Tatar "Romanya Müslüman Tatar Türklerĭ Demokrat Bĭrlĭgĭ, RMTTDB" is an ethnic minority political party in Romania representing the Tatar community.

Notable Crimean Tatars

See also
Index of articles related to Crimean Tatars
 De-Tatarization of Crimea
 Aqmescit Friday mosque
 Crimean legends
 Tatarophobia

References

Footnotes

Citations

Further reading

 Conquest, Robert. 1970. The Nation Killers: The Soviet Deportation of Nationalities (London: Macmillan).
 Fisher, Alan W. 1978. The Crimean Tatars. Stanford, CA: Hoover Institution Press.
 Fisher, Alan W. 1998. Between Russians, Ottomans and Turks: Crimea and Crimean Tatars (Istanbul: Isis Press, 1998).
 Nekrich, Alexander. 1978. The Punished Peoples: The Deportation and Fate of Soviet Minorities at the End of the Second World War (New York: W. W. Norton).
 Quelquejay, Lemercier. "The Tatars of the Crimea, a retrospective summary." Central Asian Review 16#1 (1968): 15–25.
 
 Williams, Brian Glyn. "The hidden ethnic cleansing of Muslims in the Soviet Union: The exile and repatriation of the Crimean Tatars." Journal of Contemporary History (2002): 323–347. in JSTOR
 Williams, Brian Glyn. "The Crimean Tatar exile in Central Asia: a case study in group destruction and survival." Central Asian Survey 17.2 (1998): 285–317.
 Williams, Brian Glyn. "The Ethnogenesis of the Crimean Tatars. An Historical Reinterpretation" Journal of the Royal Asiatic Society (2001) 11#3 pp. 329–348 in JSTOR
 Williams, Brian G., The Crimean Tatars: The Diaspora Experience and the Forging of a Nation, Leyden: Brill, 2001.

Other languages
 Vozgrin, Valery, 2013, Istoriya krymskykh tatar ( Valery Vozgrin "Исторические судьбы крымских татар"), Simferopol (four volumes).
 Smirnov V D, 1886, Krymskoe khanstvo
 Campana (Aurélie), Dufaud (Grégory) and Tournon (Sophie) (ed.), Les Déportations en héritage. Les peuples réprimés du Caucase et de Crimée, hier et aujourd'hui, Rennes: Presses universitaires de Rennes, 2009.

External links
 

 Official website of Qirim Tatar Cultural Association of Canada
 Official web-site of Bizim QIRIM International Nongovernmental Organization
 International Committee for Crimea
 UNDP Crimea Integration and Development Programme
 Crimean Tatar Home Page
 Crimean Tatars
 Crimean Tatar words (Turkish)
 Crimean Tatar words (English)
 State Defense Committee Decree No. 5859ss: On Crimean Tatars (See also Three answers to the Decree No. 5859ss)
 Crimean Tatars; Essays on Central Asia Index Essays on Central Asia Index
 'Крымская солидарность; ВОЗВРАЩЕНИЕ ДОМОЙ. РУСТЕМ ВАИТОВ' (YouTube channel of Crimean Tatar Solidarity; story of Rustem Vaitov returning home after 5 years of jail) 

 
Ethnic groups in Crimea
Ethnic groups in Bulgaria
Ethnic groups in Romania
Ethnic groups in Russia
Ethnic groups in Turkey
Ethnic groups in Ukraine
Ethnic groups in Uzbekistan
Turkic peoples of Europe
Islam in Crimea
Indigenous peoples of Europe
Indigenous peoples of Ukraine
Islam in Russia